Current Neurology and Neuroscience Reports is a monthly peer-reviewed medical journal covering research in neurology and neuroscience. It is published by Springer Science+Business Media and the editors-in-chief are Stanley Fahn and John C. M. Brust (Columbia University College of Physicians and Surgeons).

Abstracting an indexing 
The journal is abstracted and indexed in:

According to the Journal Citation Reports, the journal has a 2021 impact factor of 6.030.

References

External links 
 

Springer Science+Business Media academic journals
Neuroscience journals
Neurology journals
English-language journals
Monthly journals
Publications established in 2001